Renata Christian (born 1983) is a Virgin Islander beauty pageant titleholder who was the winner of the Miss U.S. Virgin Islands 2007 pageant.

Biography
Christian, a lover of science, was raised in the U.S. Virgin Islands by her mother, who is a teacher, and by her father, an entrepreneur. She is a 2000 graduate of All Saints Cathedral School in Saint Thomas, and a 2004 chemistry and biology graduate of Virginia Polytechnic Institute & State University. In 2006, Christian began serving as the Pandemic Influenza Planning Coordinator for the U.S. Virgin Islands Government's Department of Health educating her community about the dangers of the "bird flu" influenza pandemic.

Christian, was crowned Miss U.S. Virgin Islands 2007 on February 4, 2007 and credits her aspirations to become a forensic scientist to an internship she completed with the Broward County Sheriff's Office in Fort Lauderdale, Florida. Christian participated in the Miss Universe 2007 pageant on May 28, 2007. Her gown and wardrobe for this Pageant were designed by Lisa Thon of Puerto Rico.

Christian was coached by Mytsooko King, Flor Morales, Felecita Donastorg, and Virgin Islands Senator Shawn-Michael Malone.

References

1983 births
Living people
Miss Universe 2007 contestants
United States Virgin Islands models
People from Saint Thomas, U.S. Virgin Islands
Virginia Tech alumni
United States Virgin Islands beauty pageant winners